Åsåker Station was a railway station on the Spikkestad Linelocated at Åsåker in Asker, Norway. The station was opened as part of Drammenbanen on 22 December 1959, but in 1973 the new Lieråsen Tunnel opened through Lieråsen, and the old part of Drammen Line was transformed to a commuter train line.

The station was served by the Oslo Commuter Rail service to Oslo S and onward to Moss. Åsåker is primarily a residential area. The station was closed in 2012 due to low traffic.

Railway stations in Røyken
Railway stations on the Spikkestad Line
Railway stations opened in 1959
Railway stations closed in 2012
1959 establishments in Norway
2012 disestablishments in Norway
Disused railway stations in Norway